Truong Huy San, better known by his pen name Huy Đức, is a Vietnamese journalist, blogger, and author. In 2005-2006 he studied at the University of Maryland under a Hubert H. Humphrey Fellowship. In 2012 he received a fellowship from the Nieman Foundation for Journalism to study at Harvard University in Cambridge, Massachusetts.

Life 
He was born in 1962 in Ha Tinh Province, Vietnam. He served in the Vietnamese army for eight years and fought in the Sino-Vietnamese Border War of 1979 and the Vietnamese-Cambodian War in the 1980s. He then became a journalist, based in Ho Chi Minh City. He wrote for several newspapers such as Tuoi Tre, Thanh Nien, and Sai Gon Tiep Thi. Until 2010 he also wrote a blog called Osin, which was ranked as the most popular blog in Vietnam. The blog was critical of the Vietnamese government, attempting to "push the line but not cross the line". In 2009 he was dismissed from his post at Sai Gon Tiep Thi (Saigon Marketing), a state-run newspaper, because of comments on his blog. Since then he has been a freelance journalist.

While studying at Harvard, he published his book Bên Thắng Cuộc (The Winning Side). The book describes life in Vietnam after the end of the Vietnam War and the reunification of the country. It is a two-volume work. The first volume, Giải Phóng (The Liberation), was published as an e-book in 2012, followed by a hardcover edition. Even before publication he published excerpts and chapters on his Facebook page; the excerpts were widely circulated through the internet. The second volume, Quyền Bính (The Power), was published the same year. The name "The Winning Side" is inspired by a quote from Vietnamese poet Nguyễn Duy: "In every war, whichever side wins, after all/ It's the people who take the fall."

The Vietnamese government has not officially banned the book, but the state-run media has been critical of it. In some cases the Vietnamese government has seized copies of it and questioned people who had them. Critics have described the book as "perhaps the first critical, comprehensive history of Vietnam since 1975 by someone inside the country." The book ranked number one in the category Southeast Asia History for several weeks on Amazon, and since its publication it is one of the most downloaded electronic Vietnamese books.

Duc is one of many people interviewed in Ken Burns's series The Vietnam War.

Works 
 Bên thắng cuộc, Los Angeles, California : OsinBook, 2012.

References

Living people
1962 births
Vietnamese writers
Vietnamese bloggers
Vietnamese journalists
Nieman Fellows